The Caucasus Grenadier Division was an infantry unit of the Russian Imperial Army. By the time of World War I, it was garrisoned at Tiflis and was part of the 2nd Caucasus Army Corps. It would later also take part in the Russian Civil War on the side of the White movement.

Combat chronicle 
The Caucasus Grenadier Division saw action since the first days of World War I. In October–September 1914 the division took part in fighting against the German Army in the Augustów Forest (in modern-day Poland) during the East Prussia Operation, and later that month fought in the First Battle of the Masurian Lakes. From November 22–29, 1914, the division fought in the defense of Warsaw. In the spring of 1915 it took part in defending the Bzura River and later in the Siege of Novogeorgievsk. In May 1915, the Caucasus Grenadier Division fought in the defense of Galicia. Later during the Russian Civil War, some of the unit's members would join the Volunteer Army at Tsaritsyn.

Organization 
 1st Brigade
 13th Yerevan Grenadier Regiment
 14th Georgian Grenadier Regiment 
 2nd Brigade
 15th Tiflis Grenadier Regiment
 16th Mingrelian Grenadier Regiment
 Caucasus Grenadier Artillery Brigade

Commanders 
 1849–1850: KA Belgard
 1868–1877: Iosif Davydovich Tarkhan-Mouravov
 1885–1893: SA Avinov
 1917: Boris Petrovich Veselovzorov
 1917–1918: Boris Shaposhnikov

Chiefs of Staff 
 1917: Johan Laidoner

Bibliography 

Infantry divisions of the Russian Empire
Military units and formations established in 1819
Military units and formations disestablished in 1918
Tiflis Governorate